Elections in Sierra Leone are held on a national level to elect the president and the 
unicameral Parliament. Sierra Leone has a multi-party system, with two or three strong parties.

Both the president and the members of Parliament are elected for five-year terms. The Parliament has 124 members, 112  elected through plurality vote in single-member constituencies and 12 members elected by indirect vote.

An independent Electoral Commission, composed of a chairman and four commissioners, is selected by the president, subject to the approval of Parliament. The commission is responsible for voter registration and elections and referendums.  and the registration of both voters and political parties. There must also be an independent Political Parties Registration Commission, made up of four members chosen by the president.

Voters must be 18 years old and of sound mind. Voting is by secret ballot.

The last election was held on the 7th of March, 2018.

Latest elections

Presidential elections

Parliamentary elections

See also
Politics of Sierra Leone
List of political parties in Sierra Leone

References

External links
Adam Carr's Election Archive
African Elections Database
Sierra Leone 2007 Presidential Elections - Africa.no article
THE PUBLIC ELECTIONS ACT, 2012

 
Government of Sierra Leone